Dejan Vukićević (born 27 April 1968) is a Montenegrin football manager and former player.

Playing career
Vukićević started out at his hometown side Budućnost Titograd, making his senior debut in the 1987–88 season. He spent five years at the club, before switching to Mogren in 1992. The following year, Vukićević moved abroad to Cyprus to play for Pezoporikos. He subsequently returned to Yugoslavia and briefly played for Radnički Beograd, before joining Partizan in the 1996 winter transfer window. With the Crno-beli, Vukićević won back-to-back championships in 1996 and 1997. He then moved to Spain and signed with Sevilla in the 1998 winter transfer window. Before retiring from the game, Vukićević also played for Recreativo in the 1999–2000 Segunda División.

Managerial career
After hanging up his boots, Vukićević started his managerial career at Zeta in the summer of 2003. He spent the next four years at the club, winning the 2006–07 Montenegrin First League. Shortly after, Vukićević was appointed manager of Mogren. He led the side in the following three seasons, winning one Montenegrin First League and one Montenegrin Cup title.

On 15 August 2011, Vukićević was appointed manager of Vojvodina. He resigned from the position on 12 April 2012 after the club lost to Borac Čačak in the 2011–12 Serbian Cup semi-final.

Later on, Vukićević was manager of Dacia Chișinău, Ventspils, Feronikeli, and Laçi (twice).

Honours

Player
Partizan
 First League of FR Yugoslavia: 1995–96, 1996–97

Manager
Zeta
 Montenegrin First League: 2006–07
Mogren
 Montenegrin First League: 2008–09
 Montenegrin Cup: 2007–08

References

External links
 
 
 
 

1968 births
Living people
Footballers from Podgorica
Yugoslav footballers
Serbia and Montenegro footballers
Montenegrin footballers
Association football midfielders
FK Budućnost Podgorica players
FK Mogren players
Pezoporikos Larnaca players
FK Radnički Beograd players
FK Partizan players
Sevilla FC players
Recreativo de Huelva players
Yugoslav First League players
First League of Serbia and Montenegro players
Cypriot First Division players
Segunda División players
Serbia and Montenegro expatriate footballers
Expatriate footballers in Cyprus
Expatriate footballers in Spain
Serbia and Montenegro expatriate sportspeople in Cyprus
Serbia and Montenegro expatriate sportspeople in Spain
Serbia and Montenegro football managers
Montenegrin football managers
FK Zeta managers
FK Mogren managers
FK Vojvodina managers
FK Borac Čačak managers
FC Dacia Chișinău managers
OFK Titograd managers
FK Ventspils managers
KF Feronikeli managers
KF Laçi managers
Serbian SuperLiga managers
Moldovan Super Liga managers
Latvian Higher League managers
Kategoria Superiore managers
Montenegrin expatriate football managers
Expatriate football managers in Serbia
Expatriate football managers in Moldova
Expatriate football managers in Latvia
Expatriate football managers in Kosovo
Expatriate football managers in Albania
Montenegrin expatriate sportspeople in Serbia
Montenegrin expatriate sportspeople in Moldova
Montenegrin expatriate sportspeople in Latvia
Montenegrin expatriate sportspeople in Kosovo
Montenegrin expatriate sportspeople in Albania